Capraita pervittata is a species of flea beetle in the family Chrysomelidae. It is found in North America.

References

Further reading

 
 

Alticini
Articles created by Qbugbot
Beetles described in 1927
Taxa named by Doris Holmes Blake